Anthony James Holland Mangnall (born 12 August 1989) is a British politician who has served as the Member of Parliament (MP) for Totnes since 2019. A member of the Conservative Party, he worked in shipbroking and as a special adviser prior to his parliamentary career.

Early life
Mangnall's early childhood was spent in Zimbabwe and Northern Ireland, and was later educated at the Shrewsbury School in Shrewsbury, Shropshire. Mangnall studied history, politics, and sociology at the University of Exeter. During his time at university, he worked as a researcher in the parliamentary office of William Hague. 

Mangnall moved to Singapore in 2012 to work as a broker for shipbroking company Braemar ACM where he served on the small tankers desk focussing on emerging markets. He joined Poten and Partners in London in 2014 where he focussed on West Africa small tankers including the evaluation of national fuel security levels.

Mangnall then returned to work for William Hague in 2016 as his Private Secretary
managing Hague's private and public interests including working on the closure of the UK’s domestic trade of ivory. As a passionate conservationist Mangnall was able to help with the creation of a Transport Taskforce directed at eradicating the movement of illegally poached goods.

Parliamentary career
Mangnall contested the notionally safe Labour constituency of Warley in the 2017 general election.Mangnall was selected as the Conservative candidate for Totnes on 20 July 2019. Prior to his selection, he was working as a special adviser to then Secretary of State for Wales, Alun Cairns. Mangnall was elected in the 2019 general election with a majority of 12,724. The seat had previously been represented by Sarah Wollaston who had left the Conservatives in February to join Change UK, and subsequently stood as a Liberal Democrats candidate in the constituency.

Since his election to Parliament in 2019 Mangnall has been a regular contributor on debates and bills regarding fishing, farming, international trade, development, foreign policy and defence. He briefly served as a Member of the Regulatory Reform Committee between March 2020 and May 2021, and the Procedures Committee between March 2020 to July 2020. Since November 2020 he has served as a Member of International Trade Select Committee.

Mangnall has voted against the Government on numerous occasions. He was the first of the 2019 intake to vote against the Government during the Telecommunications Bill to allow Huawei to be included within the UK's telecommunication infrastructure network. The Government reversed its position after this vote and blocked Huawei from building the UK's 5G network. Mangnall was a vocal opponent of the cut to the UK's Foreign aid believing that the UK's role in international development to be globally leading and of national interest. Despite failing to win this vote on Foreign Aid, the then Chancellor Rishi Sunak MP agreed to return the foreign aid budget to 0.7% when the independent Office for Budget Responsibility’s fiscal forecast says that, on a sustainable basis, the UK is not borrowing to finance day-to-day spending and underlying debt is falling.

During the Covid pandemic Mangnall was a persistent rebel on Covid measures opposing the second and third national lockdowns. He also opposed NHS staff being forced to have vaccinations. As well as opposing the extension of wearing of face-coverings to most indoor settings. Mangnall stated in Parliament that "no government should ever use fear as a tool to try and persuade its citizens", and that the UK needed to "build up its resilience and reduce its restrictions."

Mangnall's work on the International Trade Committee has seen him become a vocal contributor about the need for Parliament to have greater scrutiny over the UK's trade deals. He has found cross party support for more time on the floor of the House of Commons for all new free trade deals to be given significant debate time and a vote. Mangnall has been a strong proponent of free trade and in 2020 he co-authored a paper through the Policy Exchange on the benefits of UK membership to the Comprehensive and Progressive Agreement for Trans-Pacific Partnership.

In February 2022 Mangnall announced that he had submitted a letter of no confidence in the then Prime Minister, Boris Johnson MP. Mangnall cited that fact that "standards in public life matter" and that Boris Johnson had fallen short of the mark expected by the British people. Mangnall gave a single interview to Telegraph journalist Chris Hope outlining his reasons.

Mangnall is Chair of the all-party parliamentary group (APPG) for the UK's Preventing Sexual Violence in Conflict Initiative as well as co-Chair for the Conflict and Global Britain APPG. He is also co-chair for Conservative Friends of International Development. In 2020 he co-authored a paper for the One Nation Conservatives exploring how to spend aid more effectively. Mangnall is an Ambassador to The HALO Trust.

In 2020, he introduced a private member's bill called the Recall of MPs (Change of Party Affiliation) Bill which intended to create a recall process if an MP voluntarily changed party affiliation.

References

External links 
 

1989 births
UK MPs 2019–present
Living people
Conservative Party (UK) MPs for English constituencies
Members of the Parliament of the United Kingdom for Totnes
People educated at Shrewsbury School
Alumni of the University of Exeter
People from South Hams (district)
British special advisers